Robur Carolinum (Latin for Charles' oak) was a constellation created by the English astronomer Edmond Halley in 1679. The name refers to the Royal Oak where Charles II was said to have hidden from the troops of Oliver Cromwell after the Battle of Worcester. It was between the constellations of Centaurus and Carina, extending into half of Vela.

Robur Carolinum as a constellation never gained popularity, probably because it used the star Eta Carinae and the Eta Carinae Nebula, and was soon dropped from use after only fifty years. Nicolas Louis de Lacaille also complained bitterly that it took some of the finest stars from Argo Navis. Its brightest star was Beta Carinae (β Car) or Miaplacidus, which was known as α Roburis or α Roburis Carolii.

References

Former constellations